The 1980 Louisville Cardinals football team season was an American football team that represented the University of Louisville as an independent during the 1980 NCAA Division I-A football season. In their first season under head coach Bob Weber, the Cardinals compiled a 5–6 record and were outscored by a total of 203 to 162.

The team's statistical leaders included Pat Patterson with 933 passing yards, Don Craft with 687 rushing yards, Kenny Robinson with 401 receiving yards, and Dave Betz with 54 points scored.

Schedule

Roster

References

Louisville
Louisville Cardinals football seasons
Louisville Cardinals football